The 2009 Acura Sports Car Challenge of St. Petersburg was the second round of the 2009 American Le Mans Series season. It took place at the Streets of St. Petersburg, Florida on April 4, 2009. The Acura ARX-02a earned its first overall victory under the Patrón Highcroft Racing team after early leader de Ferran Motorsports suffered mechanical issues. Acura also won the LMP2 category with Lowe's Fernández Racing, while GT2 was won by the Porsche of Flying Lizard Motorsports.

Report

Qualifying
In qualifying solely for the GT2 category, due to the lack of GT1 class competitors for this event, Jaime Melo in the Risi Competizione Ferrari led the pack before a red flag stopped the session due to an incident involving eventual fifth place qualifier Patrick Long in the Flying Lizard Motorsports Porsche. Farnbacher-Loles and the two BMWs completed the top of the GT2 grid.

In prototype qualifying the Acura of Simon Pagenaud dominated by earning de Ferran Motorsports a pole position by nearly a second over the other Acura of Patrón Highcroft Racing. Acura also led the LMP2 category as the Lowe's Fernández Racing car was piloted by Luis Díaz to third overall, beating the closest Dyson Lola-Mazda by three tenths of a second.

Qualifying result
Pole position winners in each class are marked in bold.

Race

Race result
Class winners in bold. Cars failing to complete 70% of winner's distance marked as Not Classified (NC).

References

Saint Petersburg
Grand Prix of St. Petersburg
2009 in sports in Florida
21st century in St. Petersburg, Florida